Walter Fletcher may refer to:
Walter Morley Fletcher (1873–1933), British physiologist and university administrator
Walter Fletcher (politician) (1892–1956), British Conservative Member of Parliament
Walter Fletcher (running back)